The 2002 Pocono 500 was the 14th stock car race of the 2002 NASCAR Winston Cup Series and the 21st iteration of the event. The race was held on Sunday, June 9, 2002, in Long Pond, Pennsylvania, at Pocono Raceway, a 2.5 miles (4.0 km) triangular permanent course. The race took the scheduled 200 laps to complete. At race's end, Dale Jarrett, driving for Robert Yates Racing, would pass disaster-stricken teammate Ricky Rudd with six to go when Rudd blew a tire while coasting to the finish on the final lap. As a result, the race would end under caution, and Jarrett would win his 29th career NASCAR Winston Cup Series win and his first and only win of the season. To fill out the podium, Mark Martin of Roush Racing and Jimmie Johnson of Hendrick Motorsports would finish second and third, respectively.

Background 

The race was held at Pocono Raceway, which is a three-turn superspeedway located in Long Pond, Pennsylvania. The track hosts two annual NASCAR Sprint Cup Series races, as well as one Xfinity Series and Camping World Truck Series event. Until 2019, the track also hosted an IndyCar Series race.

Pocono Raceway is one of a very few NASCAR tracks not owned by either Speedway Motorsports, Inc. or International Speedway Corporation. It is operated by the Igdalsky siblings Brandon, Nicholas, and sister Ashley, and cousins Joseph IV and Chase Mattioli, all of whom are third-generation members of the family-owned Mattco Inc, started by Joseph II and Rose Mattioli.

Outside of the NASCAR races, the track is used throughout the year by Sports Car Club of America (SCCA) and motorcycle clubs as well as racing schools and an IndyCar race. The triangular oval also has three separate infield sections of racetrack – North Course, East Course and South Course. Each of these infield sections use a separate portion of the tri-oval to complete the track. During regular non-race weekends, multiple clubs can use the track by running on different infield sections. Also some of the infield sections can be run in either direction, or multiple infield sections can be put together – such as running the North Course and the South Course and using the tri-oval to connect the two.

Entry list 

 (R) denotes rookie driver.

Practice 
Originally, three practice sessions were scheduled to be held, with one session on Friday and two on Saturday. However, due to overnight rain causing groundwater to seep out onto the racetrack on Friday, the Friday session was canceled.

First practice 
The first practice session was held on Saturday, June 8, at 9:30 AM EST, and would last for 45 minutes.

Second and final practice 
The second and final practice session, sometimes referred to as Happy Hour, was held on Saturday, June 8, at 11:15 AM EST, and would last for 45 minutes.

Qualifying 
Qualifying was scheduled to be held on Friday, June 7, at 3:05 PM EST. However, due to overnight rain causing groundwater to seep out onto the racetrack, qualifying was canceled. As a result, the starting lineup was based on the current owner's points standings.

Sterling Marlin of Chip Ganassi Racing would win the pole.

No drivers would fail to qualify.

Full starting lineup

Race results

References 

2002 NASCAR Winston Cup Series
NASCAR races at Pocono Raceway
June 2002 sports events in the United States
2002 in sports in Pennsylvania